Haathi Ke Daant is a 1973 Bollywood drama film directed by B.R.Ishara. The film stars Rakesh Pandey.

Cast
Rakesh Pandey

Soundtrack
The music of the film was composed by Ravindra Jain. Lyricist information as per below. 

"Chal Chal Kahi Door Jaha" - Suman Kalyanpur, Lyrics Kapil Kumar
"Man Ka Mere Tan Ka Mere" - Asha Bhosle, Lyrics Kapil Kumar

External links
 

1973 films
1970s Hindi-language films
1973 drama films
Films scored by Ravindra Jain
Films directed by B. R. Ishara
Indian drama films